Shahuanga Punta (possibly from Quechua Shawanka Punta) is a  mountain in the Cordillera Blanca in the Andes of Peru. It is situated in the Ancash Region, Huari Province, Chavín de Huantar District, and in the Recuay Province, Catac District. It lies north of Queshque.

References 

Mountains of Peru
Mountains of Ancash Region